The Terror of Pueblo is a 1924 American silent western film directed by Denver Dixon, and starring Art Mix and Alma Rayford. It premiered on December 26, 1924, in Emporia, Kansas.

Plot
As described in a film magazine review, Bill Hanley and Sam Hawkes still settle their disputes with guns. The arrival of Jack Hanley forces the issue, but Jack is averse to bloodshed. He becomes the laughing stock of the ranch, but turns on them finally and after rescuing his father, routs the enemy and wins the girl.

Cast
 Art Mix as Jack Hanley (credited as George Kesterson)
 Alma Rayford as Anita
 Lafe McKee
 Jim Welch
 William Berke  (credited as William Lester)
 Milburn Morante
 Mary Bruce

References

Silent American Western (genre) films
American black-and-white films
Films directed by Victor Adamson
1920s English-language films